Howard Graham Swafford (October 11, 1919 – February 4, 2016) was an American politician in the state of Tennessee. Swafford served in the Tennessee House of Representatives as a Republican from the 12th District from 1973 to 1985. A native of Jasper, Tennessee, he was a lawyer, member of the Tennessee Bar Association and alumnus of the University of Tennessee at Knoxville. He was also a veteran of World War II, serving as a Naval Aviator Pilot. He participated in the Battle of Iwo Jima and served on the USS South Dakota (BB-57).

References

1919 births
2016 deaths
Republican Party members of the Tennessee House of Representatives
People from Jasper, Tennessee
University of Tennessee alumni
United States Navy pilots of World War II
People from South Pittsburg, Tennessee